Christopher Mhlengwa Zikode (born 1975) is a South African rapist and serial killer who was convicted in 1995 on eight counts of murder, five counts of rape, five counts of attempted murder, and two counts of indecent assault. Zikode is, however, considered responsible for at least 18 murders and 11 attempted murders.

Criminal career
Zikode terrorised the small, rural South African town of Donnybrook, KwaZulu-Natal. Over the course of two years, Zikode attacked households as well as single women traversing rural terrain. His typical modus operandi was to force entry into a household and shoot all male members of the family. He would then take the remaining woman/women into nearby fields or plantations and rape them repeatedly, on occasion for more than five hours. Uncooperative victims would be shot before he proceeded to commit necrophilia.

Zikode was eventually arrested on 29 September 1995. He was sentenced on 7 January 1997 to 140 years in prison. Zikode had been arrested for the first time in July 1995 for the attempted murder of Beauty Zulu. While on bail, he is known to have committed further crimes including one count of murder and two counts of attempted murder.

Zikode was convicted with the assistance of South African psychologist and criminal profiler Micki Pistorius.

See also
List of serial killers by country
List of serial killers by number of victims

References 

1975 births
Living people
Male serial killers
Necrophiles
People convicted of indecent assault
People convicted of murder by South Africa
South African people convicted of murder
South African people convicted of rape
South African serial killers